Heyward is a surname and given name.

Surname
Notable people with the surname include:

 Andrew Heyward, former President of CBS News
 Andy Heyward (born 1949), American television producer
 Cameron Heyward (born 1989), American football player
 Connor Heyward (born 1999), American football player
 Craig Heyward (1966–2006), American football player
 Darrius Heyward-Bey (born 1987), American football player
 Dick Heyward (1914–2005), deputy executive director of UNICEF 
 Dorothy Heyward (1890–1961), American playwright
 DuBose Heyward (1885–1940), American author 
 Duncan Clinch Heyward (1864–1943), American politician, Governor of South Carolina
 Elisabeth Heyward (1919–2007), Nuremberg Trials interpreter
 Jason Heyward (born 1989), American baseball player
 Jonathon Heyward, American conductor
 Louis M. Heyward (1920–2002), American film and television screenwriter
 Nick Heyward (born 1961), British musician
 Susan Heyward (born 1982), American actress
 Thomas Heyward Jr. (1746–1809), representative of South Carolina, signer of the United States Declaration of Independence

Given name
Notable people with the given name include:
 Heyward Shepherd (1825–1859), a black man killed during John Brown's raid on Harpers Ferry
 Heyward Isham (Henry Heyward Isham, 1926–2009), negotiator who played an important role in the talks with North Vietnam that led to the Peace accord of 1973

See also
Hayward (surname)